Tomas Tsvyatkov (Bulgarian: Томас Цвятков; born 1 June 1997) is a Bulgarian footballer who plays as a midfielder.

Career

Youth career
Tsvyatkov began his career in the local team Etar 1924 when he was nine. He later moved to Litex Lovech academy, before joining Ludogorets Razgrad.

Ludogorets Razgrad
In 2014 Tsvyatkov was called to train with the first team for first time, together with Oleg Dimitrov. On 28 May 2017 he complete his debut for the team in the First League for the 3:1 win over Cherno More. Three days later, in match against Lokomotiv Plovdiv, he scored his first goal for the team.

Tsvyatkov started the 2017-18 season in Ludogorets II playing in the first match of the season against Lokomotiv 1929 Sofia.

Return to Litex
In June 2018, Tsvyatkov joined Litex. After 4 matches in 2 years, due to injuries, Tsvyatkov moved to Spartak Varna.

Career statistics

Club

References

External links
 

1997 births
Living people
Bulgarian footballers
Bulgaria youth international footballers
Second Professional Football League (Bulgaria) players
First Professional Football League (Bulgaria) players
PFC Litex Lovech players
PFC Ludogorets Razgrad II players
PFC Ludogorets Razgrad players
PFC Spartak Varna players
Association football midfielders
People from Veliko Tarnovo
Sportspeople from Veliko Tarnovo Province